Stella Mae Parton (born May 4, 1949) is an American country singer and songwriter widely known for a series of country singles that charted during the mid-to-late-1970s, her biggest hit being "I Want to Hold You in My Dreams Tonight" in 1975. She is the younger sister of the country music entertainer Dolly Parton and the older sister of the singer Randy Parton and former actress Rachel Dennison.

Early life 
Parton was born in Sevierville, Tennessee, the sixth of 12 children born to Avie Lee Caroline (née Owens; 1923–2003) and Robert Lee Parton Sr. (1921–2000). Dolly Parton is her elder sister by three years. When Stella was seven, she and Dolly appeared on a Knoxville television program, and two years later she debuted on radio. During this time, Stella and her sisters Willadeene and Cassie formed a group who sang gospel music and made commercials around East Tennessee. During her high school years, she began writing songs. She married Marvin Carroll Rauhuff just before her high school graduation in 1966. She had one son by this marriage.

Recording career 
In 1967, Parton released her first album, In the Garden (a gospel project with Willadeene, Cassie and their mother). Shortly thereafter, she moved to Washington, D.C., and began performing at the Hillbilly Heaven club. Later moving to Nashville, she started her own record label, Soul, Country and Blues, in 1975 and released her first solo album, I Want to Hold You in My Dreams Tonight. Its title track was a substantial national hit, climbing into the country top ten. Its success earned her a major-label deal with Elektra in 1976. Her 1977 duet with Carmol Taylor, "Neon Woman", was somewhat successful, and she had three top 20 hits over 1977–1978 with "The Danger of a Stranger", "Four Little Letters" and "Standard Lie Number One". She had an additional top-40 hit with her sister Dolly's composition, "Steady as the Rain", in 1979. She recorded three albums for Elektra up to 1979. In 1984, Stella performed a song with Kin Vassey for the soundtrack of the movie Rhinestone, in which Dolly starred.

Though her chart success tapered off after leaving Elektra in 1980, she continued to record, releasing albums for several independent labels, including Accord/Townhouse and Airborne. She is currently with Raptor Records. To date, she has released 22 albums and has had 28 charting singles.

Parton has released a DVD, Live in Nashville, of footage from a 1990 concert in Nashville taken from the Attic Entertainment archives. It is the first of a planned Vintage Collection Series.

In 2019, Parton released an album, Survivor. In addition to eight original songs, Survivor has a cover version of "Wake Me Up" by Avicii and Parton's interpretation of the Bob Seger classic, "Like a Rock".

Television and film work 
In 1979, Parton starred in The Dukes of Hazzard episode titled "Deputy Dukes" as Mary Beth Malone, a woman who impersonates a police officer to settle a family score with a prisoner who ends up being transported by Bo (John Schneider) and Luke (Tom Wopat) during a change of venue.

During the 1980s and early 1990s, she starred in several Broadway touring musicals, including Seven Brides for Seven Brothers, Pump Boys & Dinettes, Best Little Whorehouse In Texas and Gentlemen Prefer Blondes. Parton also wrote and staged several Dollywood shows the opening season, as well as appearing on The Dukes of Hazzard (the first country artist to have a dramatic role on the series), Live with Regis and Kathy Lee, The Today Show and Good Morning America. She has been on several international radio programs, including Get Focused Radio with host Kate Hennessy.

Parton appeared with Gena Rowlands and Louis Gossett in the 2000 TV movie The Color of Love: Jacey's Story which was nominated for a Primetime Emmy award.

In 2006, Parton made appearances in two films, A Dance for Bethany and Ghost Town, both scheduled for release in 2007. Each film also includes her music on the soundtrack. Also ready for release in 2007 was her 21st album, which is a collection of original contemporary Christian songs. Followed in 2008, was her 22nd album, Testimony.

She appeared in Dolly Parton's Coat of Many Colors with Jennifer Nettles and Ricky Schroder, an NBC made-for-TV movie based on Dolly's song of the same name that was first broadcast on NBC in December 2015.

In 2016, Parton appeared in Dolly Parton's Christmas of Many Colors: Circle of Love as Corla Bass. The NBC TV movie was nominated for a Primetime Emmy award for Outstanding Television Movie.

In 2018, she took part in the BBC's Celebrity Masterchef series.

She appeared as a mystery guest on To Tell the Truth hosted by Anthony Anderson in 2021, and none of the panelists guessed her as the real sibling of Dolly Parton.

In 2022 she appeared in the Pure Flix film Nothing is Impossible, starring David A.R. White, which was filmed in Tennessee.

Social work 
She devotes much of her time to causes such as domestic violence and teaches at the New Opportunity School for Women at Berea College, Kentucky, using her knowledge of hair and make-up to help women build self-esteem.

Parton has been a national spokesperson for Mothers Against Drunk Driving and the Christian Appalachian Project and National Honorary Country Music Ambassador to the American Cancer Society.

Parton went viral on Twitter in December 2020 with a tweet criticizing "old moldy politicians" over the COVID-19 vaccine rollout in the United States.

Consultancy 
She has a consulting business (Attic Entertainment Artist Development and Entertainment Consulting) teaching stage presence, hair, make-up, wardrobe techniques and video coaching. Parton has also written three cookbooks, including her recipe-packed book State Fairs and Church Bazaars.

Discography 

In the Garden  (1968)
Stella (And the Gospel Carrolls) (1972)
I Want to Hold You in My Dreams (1975)
Country Sweet (1977)
Stella Parton (1978)
Love Ya (1979)
True to Me (1980)
So Far, So Good (1982)
Always Tomorrow (1989)
A Woman's Touch (1995)
Appalachian Blues (2001)
Blue Heart (2002)
Appalachian Gospel (2003)
Songwriter Sessions (2006)
Holiday Magic (2008)
Testimony (2008)
American Coal (2010)
Buried Treasure (2014)
Last Train to Memphis (2015)
Mountain Songbird (2016)
Nashville Nights (2016)
Old Time Singing (2017)
Survivor (2018)

References

External links 
Stella Parton – Country, Gospel & Appalachian Music
 
 
 Entry at 45cat.com

1949 births
Living people
20th-century American singers
20th-century American women singers
21st-century American singers
21st-century American women singers
American country singer-songwriters
American women country singers
American Pentecostals
Christians from Tennessee
People from Sevierville, Tennessee